WGBK 88.5 FM is a non commercial radio station operated by the students and faculty advisers of Glenbrook South High School in Glenview, Cook County, Illinois and Glenbrook North High School in Northbrook, Illinois.

History as WMWA 
The station was originally owned and operated as WMWA by the Midwestern Academy, a Christian day school affiliated with the General Church of the New Jerusalem. The radio courses at Glenbrook South were started in 1981. Shortly thereafter, in 1982, the high school bought evening time on WMWA. In 1996, the high school district purchased the station and requested a call letter change (hence WGBK).

Programming 
WGBK currently serves Chicago's North Shore communities. WGBK programs popular music, covers local news, and broadcasts local high school sports. The high school radio station was founded and developed by Dell Kennedy who has retired from the teaching profession. In August 2004, the station began broadcasting 24 hours per day and streaming its broadcasts online. The station has been managed since the summer of 2004 by one of Dell Kennedy's former students, Dan Oswald, who was a student in the program from 1988 to 1992.

Glenbrook South 2002 graduate and Fall Out Boy lead singer Patrick Stump worked on the radio station during his high school career under the direction of Dell Kennedy.

In 2004, the station received 2nd place in the John Drury High School Radio Awards, and has continued to be awarded for excellence in student broadcasting and production.

References

External links
WGBK- Glenbrook South
Course Descriptions
WGBK History
WGBK Live Stream
WGBK- Glenbrook North

GBK
High school radio stations in the United States